Charlotte–Monroe Executive Airport  is a public use airport located five nautical miles (9 km) northwest of the central business district of Monroe, a city in Union County, North Carolina, United States. It is owned by the City of Monroe and was formerly known as Monroe Regional Airport.

According to the FAA's National Plan of Integrated Airport Systems for 2009–2013, it is a reliever airport for Charlotte/Douglas International Airport.

Although many U.S. airports use the same three-letter location identifier for the FAA and IATA, this airport is assigned EQY by the FAA but has no designation from the IATA.

Facilities and aircraft 
It has one runway designated 5/23 with an asphalt surface measuring 5,500 by 100 feet (1,676 x 30 m).

For the 12-month period ending August 20, 2008, the airport had 56,100 aircraft operations, an average of 153 per day: 91% general aviation, 7% air taxi, and 1% military. At that time there were 86 aircraft based at this airport: 82.6% single-engine, 11.6% multi-engine, 3.5% jet and 2.3% helicopter.

As of October 18, 2007, the City of Monroe was requesting funding from state and federal sources for $25 million in improvements to Monroe Regional Airport. These improvements, to be finished by the summer of 2009, included extending the runway to up to 7500 feet, adding more hangars, and expanding the terminal.

References

External links 
 Airport Website
  at North Carolina DOT airport guide
 Aerial photo as of March 1998 from USGS The National Map
 

Airports in North Carolina
Transportation in Union County, North Carolina
Buildings and structures in Union County, North Carolina